Oubliette Mountain is a  mountain summit located on the shared border of Jasper National Park in Alberta, and Mount Robson Provincial Park in British Columbia, Canada. Situated in the Tonquin Valley, Oubliette Mountain is part of The Ramparts in the Canadian Rockies. The nearest higher neighbor is Dungeon Peak,  to the northwest. Not coincidentally,  an oubliette is a secret dungeon with access only through a trapdoor in its ceiling. The mountain's descriptive name was coined by Cyril G. Wates.

History
The first ascent was made in July 1932 by William Hainsworth and Max Strumia, with guide Hans Fuhrer.

The first ascent of the East Buttress was made July 27, 1962 by Fred Beckey, Brian Greenwood, and Don Gordon. This climbing route is included in Beckey's book titled "Fred Beckey's 100 Favorite North American Climbs".

Climate
Based on the Köppen climate classification, Oubliette Mountain is located in a subarctic climate zone with cold, snowy winters, and mild summers. Winter temperatures can drop below -20 °C with wind chill factors below -30 °C. In terms of favorable weather, July and August present the best months for climbing. However, these months coincide with mosquito season, which requires effective defenses. Precipitation runoff from Oubliette Mountain drains into tributaries of the Athabasca River on its east side, and the headwaters of the Fraser River from the west side.

Geology
Oubliette Mountain is composed of quartzite laid down during the Cambrian period. This rock was pushed east and over the top of younger rock during the Laramide orogeny.

See also
 List of peaks on the British Columbia–Alberta border

Gallery

References

External links
 Parks Canada web site: Jasper National Park
 Provincial Park web site: Mount Robson Provincial Park
 Topography map: Oubliette Peak

Three-thousanders of Alberta
Three-thousanders of British Columbia
Canadian Rockies
Mountains of Jasper National Park
Mount Robson Provincial Park